{{DISPLAYTITLE:C8H18O3}}
The molecular formula C8H18O3 (molar mass: 162.229 g/mol) may refer to:

 DEG monobutyl ether
 Diethylene glycol diethyl ether
 Triethyl orthoacetate

Molecular formulas